Styczeń is a Polish surname which means "January". Notable people with the surname include:
 Wawrzyniec Styczeń (1836–1908), Polish activist
 Zdzisław Styczeń (1894–1978), Polish footballer

See also
 

Polish-language surnames